Andrey Yevgenyevich Dunayev (14 May 1949 – 9 December 2015) is a retired Russian swimmer who won the silver medal in 400 m medley at the 1966 European Aquatics Championships. Next year he set a new European record, and in 1968 a new world record in the same event, but finished only seventh at the 1968 Summer Olympics. Between 1964 and 1968 he won 10 national titles and set 9 national records in the 200 m and 400 m medley and 800 m and 1500 m freestyle events. In the 1990s, he also won national titles in the masters category.

See also 
 World record progression 400 metres medley

References 

1949 births
Russian male swimmers
Living people
Swimmers at the 1968 Summer Olympics
Soviet male swimmers
Olympic swimmers of the Soviet Union
European Aquatics Championships medalists in swimming